Nikolai Konstantinovich Koltsov (July 14, 1872 – December 2, 1940) was a Russian biologist and a pioneer of modern genetics. Among his students were Nikolay Timofeeff-Ressovsky, Vladimir Pavlovich Efroimson, A.S. Serebrovsky, and Nikolay Dubinin. Along with his students, he demonstrated the fine structure of genes, and examined the structure of the cell and pioneered the idea of a cytoskeleton. His career was cut short in Stalinist Russia due to the entanglement of Marxist ideology and interpretations that genetics was a science that supported racism, fascism and eugenics. He died unexpectedly following government persecution and there are allegations that he was executed.

Biography
Koltsov was born in a well-to do family and graduated from Moscow University in 1894 and was a professor there (1895–1911). He established and directed the Institute of Experimental Biology in the middle of 1917, just before the October revolution. He was a member of the Agricultural Academy (VASKhNIL). He was against the Tsarist regime but after the revolution, he opposed several policies of the new rule. In 1920, Koltsov was arrested as a member of the non-existent "anti-Soviet Tactical Center" invented by the VCheKa. Prosecutor Nikolai Krylenko demanded the death sentence for Koltsov (67 of around 1000 arrested people were executed). However, after a personal appeal to Vladimir Lenin by Maxim Gorky Koltsov was released and was restored to his position as the head of the Koltsov Institute of Experimental Biology.The politics of the Soviet Union made the idea of genes, particles that genes decided outcomes in life as antithetical to the concept of individual freedom. Marxist ideologues also clubbed geneticists with eugenicists, racists, and fascists while also preferring ideas from Lamarckism as promoted by Trofim Lysenko. 
In 1937 and 1939, the supporters of Lysenko published a series of propaganda articles against Nikolai Koltsov and Nikolai Vavilov. They wrote: "The Institute of Genetics of the Academy of Sciences not only did not criticize Professor Koltsov's fascistic nonsense, but even did not dissociate itself from his "theories" which support the racial theories of fascists". His death in 1940 was claimed to have been due to a stroke. However, "the biochemist Ilya Zbarsky revealed that the unexpected death of Koltsov was a result of his poisoning by the NKVD", the secret police of the Soviet Union. On the same day his wife, the scientist Maria Sadovnikova Koltsova, committed suicide.

Research
Nikolai Koltsov worked on cytology and vertebrate anatomy. In 1903 Koltsov proposed that the shape of cells was determined by a network of tubules forming a skeleton which was later termed as the cytoskeleton. He saw the role of gel-sol transitions in the cytoplasm as key mechanisms for the cell structure. In 1927 Koltsov proposed that inherited traits would be inherited via a "giant hereditary molecule" which would be made up of "two mirror strands that would replicate in a semi-conservative fashion using each strand as a template". Koltsov used the expression omnis molecula ex molecula (every molecule comes from another molecule) based on Virchow's idea that all cells came from other cells. These ideas were confirmed to have been accurate in 1953 when James D. Watson and Francis Crick described the structure of DNA. Watson and Crick had apparently not heard of Koltsov. US geneticist Richard Goldschmidt wrote about him: "There was the brilliant Nikolai Koltsov, probably the best Russian zoologist of the last generation, an enviable, unbelievably cultured, clear-thinking scholar, admired by everybody who knew him". He also suggested that electrical forces were involved in intracellular movement. He termed it as cataphoresis.

Legacy
Koltsovo, a small municipality in Novosibirsk Oblast, in 2003 obtained the status of the Science town of the Russian Federation and was named after Nikolai Koltsov.

References

1872 births
1940 deaths
Deaths by poisoning
Russian biologists
Russian geneticists
Soviet biologists
20th-century biologists
Soviet geneticists
Corresponding members of the Saint Petersburg Academy of Sciences
Corresponding Members of the Russian Academy of Sciences (1917–1925)
Corresponding Members of the USSR Academy of Sciences
Academicians of the VASKhNIL
Fellows of the Royal Society of Edinburgh
Burials at Vvedenskoye Cemetery